Sellers may refer to

 Seller, someone who sells
 Sellers, Missouri, an unincorporated community
 Sellers, South Carolina, a small US town
 USS Sellers (DDG-11), a US Navy destroyer
Sellers (surname), people with the surname Sellers

See also
 Cellar (disambiguation)
 Fort Sellers
 Sellars